Callopora is a genus of bryozoans belonging to the family Calloporidae.

The genus has cosmopolitan distribution.

Species

Species:

Callopora acuminella 
Callopora armata 
Callopora asanoi

References

Bryozoan genera